Qoşasu is a village in the Lachin District of Azerbaijan.

History 
The village was located in the Armenian-occupied territories surrounding Nagorno-Karabakh, coming under the control of ethnic Armenian forces on May 17, 1992 during the First Nagorno-Karabakh War. The village subsequently became part of the breakaway Republic of Artsakh as part of its Kashatagh Province, referred to as Ani, being part of the Drakhtadzor community. The village was returned to Azerbaijan as part of the 2020 Nagorno-Karabakh ceasefire agreement.

References

External links 

Populated places in Lachin District